General Osborn may refer to:

Frederick Osborn (1889–1981), U.S. Army major general
Thomas O. Osborn (1832–1904), Union Army brigadier general and brevet major general
Sir George Osborn, 4th Baronet (1742–1818), British Army general

See also
Edmund Osborne (1885–1969), British Army lieutenant general
Attorney General Osborne (disambiguation)